Bishopstone is a village and civil parish in Herefordshire, England,  west of Hereford, near the River Wye and the Roman town of Magnis.  According to the 2001 census, it had a population of 199, increasing to 208 at the 2011 census.

References

External links

Villages in Herefordshire